The Słupsk trolleybus system was a trolleybus network operated by MPK Słupsk in Słupsk, Poland, from 1985 to 1999. The system measured at the most 19.1 km on three lines.

History 
The first trolleybus projects in Słupsk date back to the 1930s, when one trolleybus line was planned. It was to connect Kobylnica with Brusków Wielki. This plan was not implemented.

At the end of the 1970s, the voivodeship transport company WPKM Słupsk developed a project of Słupsk trolleybus system. The plan assumed the construction of five trolleybus lines, including one to Ustka, 18 km away from Słupsk. First construction works began in April 1985.

The opening of the first line, marked with A, took place on 21 July 1985. The line was served by ten ZiU-9 trolleybuses purchased from the USSR. The next two lines were launched on 11 November 1986 (B) and 27 June 1987 (C). Bad economic situation does not allowed the opening of lines D and E.

In the early 1990s, eleven functional trolleybuses were scrapped. This caused rolling stock problems and forced trolleybuses to be supported by buses. However, three buses were converted into trolleybuses. 

In July 1997, MZK Słupsk exchanged seven operational trolleybuses for seven buses from Tychy. The remaining vehicles were not enough to fully serve the system. The network's profitability has dropped dramatically. Until 1999, only seven trolleybuses were able to operate. It started first voice opinions about the network closure. Pro-decommission arguments were as follows:

 maintaining infrastructure for five vehicles is not cost-effective
 cables supplying the rectifier station should be replaced
 trolleybuses slow down the traffic
 the network is old and exploited
 rectifier stations produce too much electric energy

In May 1999 began dismantling of the overhead lines at Hubalczyków street, meaning the end of lines B and C. On 18 October 1999, the last A-line trolleybuses went into the streets.

Lines 
Lines as of 1987:

References

Notes

External links

Trolleybus transport in Poland
Defunct trolleybus systems by city
Słupsk
1985 establishments in Poland